Copelatus chibcha is a species of diving beetle. It is part of the genus Copelatus of the subfamily Copelatinae in the family Dytiscidae. It was described by Guignot in 1952.

References

chibcha
Beetles described in 1939